The 1926 United States Senate election in Maryland was held on November 2, 1926. Incumbent Republican U.S. Senator Ovington Weller ran for re-election to a second term in office, but was beaten badly by Democratic U.S. Representative Millard Tydings of Havre de Grace.

Republican primary

Candidates
John Philip Hill, U.S. Representative from Baltimore
Ovington Weller, incumbent Senator since 1921

Results

General election

Results

See also 
 1926 United States Senate elections

References 

Maryland
1926
United States Senate